Saw Sala was the chief consort of Gov. Thawun Nge of Toungoo (Taungoo) from 1317 to 1324. After her husband's death, she became the regent on behalf of her young son Saw Hnit, and ran Toungoo for about a year. Her rule was unpopular. She and her son were overthrown by Chief Minister Kayin Ba in 1325. She escaped the coup at the governor's palace which killed Saw Hnit. But she died on the run near Taungdwingyi.

References

Bibliography
 

Queens consort of Toungoo dynasty
13th-century Burmese women
14th-century Burmese women